Martand Singh (15 March 192320 November 1995) was an Indian wildlife conservationist, parliamentarian and the last ruling Maharaja of the princely state of Rewa. Born in 1923 to Gulab Singh at Fort of Govindgarh, then the Maharajah of Rewa, he did his college studies at Daly College, Indore and continued at Mayo College, Ajmer from where he graduated in 1941. After the death of his father in 1946, he became the Maharajah of Rewa and retained the title, but not the power, until the government abolished royalty in 1970.

Fascinated by the rare breed of white tiger which was native to Rewa, he worked to protect the species and making the region poacher-free. He also reared a white tiger which he found as a cub. After the abolition of royalty, Singh represented Rewa in the 5th Lok Sabha (1971), 7th Lok Sabha (1980) and the 8th Lok Sabha (1984). The Government of India awarded him the third-highest civilian honour of the Padma Bhushan, in 1986, for his contributions to society.

Singh was married to Princess Pravina of Kutch and the couple had one son. He died on 20 November 1995, at the age of 72. He was again in the news in 2013 when his son filed a lawsuit regarding the allegedly illegal sale of Rewa Kothi, their Mumbai bungalow with a reported value of 2 billion, using a fake power of attorney. Martand Singh's property is controlled by His Highness Maharaja Martand Singh Charitable Trust.

Singh committed to nature conservation and the fight against poaching. The foundation of the Bandhavgarh National Park in the Vindhya Mountains was his initiative.

In particular, the preservation of the rare species of the white tiger (a half albino), which is native to Rewa, was close to his heart. Martand Singh even succeeded in breeding this breed in captivity for the first time with the male tiger Mohan, who was captured in the jungle in 1951. All white Bengal tigers living in zoological gardens or shown in shows worldwide today ultimately trace their pedigree back to this specimen.  

As a philanthropist and donor, Martand Singh supported many social and medical institutions for needy and sick people, and the establishment and further development of a modern infrastructure in his constituency was also one of his main concerns.

Honours
 World's first White Tiger Safari located at Mukundpur, Satna was named after him as Maharaja Martand Singh Judeo White Tiger Safari and Zoo.

References

External links 
 

Recipients of the Padma Bhushan in public affairs
India MPs 1971–1977
India MPs 1980–1984
India MPs 1984–1989
1923 births
1995 deaths
Indian royalty
Lok Sabha members from Madhya Pradesh
Indian conservationists